Bolbro Hill is a hill in the western part of the Bolbro District in Odense, Denmark. It was the location of the famous Odinstårnet (Odin Tower) from 1935 to 1944.

References 

Hills of Denmark
Geography of Funen